Rory Sloane (born 17 March 1990) is a professional Australian rules footballer playing for the Adelaide Football Club in the Australian Football League (AFL). Sloane is a dual Malcolm Blight Medallist and was selected in the All-Australian team in 2016. He also won a Showdown Medal in 2017. Sloane served as Adelaide co-captain in 2019, and has served as the sole captain since the 2020 season.

Early life
Originally from Victoria, Sloane was first part of TAC Cup side Eastern Ranges under-18 side when he was only 16, and went on to captain Eastern Ranges in 2008. He was drafted by Adelaide with pick 44 in the 2008 AFL draft.

Growing up, Sloane supported the St Kilda Football Club.

AFL career
Sloane strained a medial ligament in his knee prior to the start of the 2009 season but upon returning quickly forced his way into the  seniors in the SANFL and showed strong form, prompting Adelaide coach Neil Craig to comment, "He'll be an exciting player for us in the future…our supporters will like Rory Sloane." Sloane made his AFL debut in round 20 against . He did not record a kick but had seven tackles.

Sloane played his second game in round 1, 2010, but sustained a serious ankle injury during the clash against  which saw him out of the side for several weeks. He returned to play 14 matches for the season, averaging more than 15 disposals as a midfielder. He also signed a new contract with the Crows during the year.

For the second consecutive year, Sloane was injured in the first game in 2011, against Hawthorn, and was sidelined for several weeks with a fractured jaw and broken thumb. After returning, Sloane played out the remainder of the season, averaging 20 disposals and 5 tackles per game, including a 36-possession game against eventual premiers  in round 21. Midway through the year, he revealed he had signed a three-year deal with the Crows, saying, "The way Brenton [Sanderson] and the rest of the coaching staff have gone about creating this really enjoyable environment for us to be involved in - I think that's a big reason why everyone wants to stay around". Sloane lifted his game yet again in 2013, averaging 23.5 possessions, winning the Malcolm Blight Medal for the best and fairest Crows player, and polling 15 votes in the Brownlow Medal.

Due to the season-ending Achilles injury sustained by captain Nathan van Berlo during pre-season training in 2014, Sloane and Patrick Dangerfield were named as acting co-captains of the Adelaide Football Club for the 2014 season. Sloane continued to thrive in 2014, finishing second in the Malcolm Blight Medal behind Daniel Talia. He played his 100th AFL game in round 23 against .

In June 2015, Sloane signed a three-year contract extension with Adelaide, keeping him at the club until 2018. Sloane twice injured his cheekbone during the season, missing a total of five games, but despite that remained one of the club's elite players, finishing sixth in Adelaide's best and fairest.

Sloane had an outstanding year in 2016, averaging 25 disposals and leading the club in contested possessions and tackles. He was considered a contender for the Brownlow Medal before being suspended for rough conduct late in the season, rendering him ineligible for the award. Sloane was rewarded with his second Malcolm Blight Medal as the club's best and fairest player, and was also named vice-captain in the 2016 All-Australian team while being the runner-up in the AFLPA Most Valuable Player award.

Sloane had an outstanding start to 2017, winning the Showdown Medal in round 3 and averaging 29.5 disposals per game while the Crows remained undefeated in the first six rounds. He started to struggle when other teams began heavily tagging him,  notably playing ex-Crow Bernie Vince on him, causing the Crows to lose their next two matches. Sloane worked hard to improve against these tags, but again he struggled against Melbourne in round 17 when Vince kept him to just 8 possessions before he was knocked out in a Dean Kent tackle and sat out the rest of the game. Before Adelaide's qualifying final against , Sloane had surgery to have his appendix removed and was forced to miss the match. Sloane's strong performances throughout the season were respected by his teammates, who nominated him for both the AFL Players' Association MVP Award and the Most Courageous Award.

Sloane's future was up in the air during the 2018 season as multiple clubs were eager to lure him back to his home state in Victoria. However, in a move the surprised many, Sloane resigned for a further five years to commit the rest of his career to Adelaide.

In 2019, Sloane was appointed as co-captain of the Adelaide Football Club alongside Taylor Walker.

In 2020, Sloane assumed the sole captaincy and in round one played his 200th AFL game against the Sydney Swans at the Adelaide Oval, which the Crows lost by three points.

Sloane injured his knee in Adelaide's win over Richmond in round 5 of the 2022 season; scans later confirmed a ruptured anterior cruciate ligament, forcing him to miss the rest of the season.

Statistics
Updated to the end of round 1, 2023.

|-
| 2009 ||  || 31
| 1 || 0 || 0 || 0 || 6 || 6 || 1 || 7 || 0.0 || 0.0 || 0.0 || 6.0 || 6.0 || 1.0 || 7.0 || 0
|-
| 2010 ||  || 31
| 14 || 7 || 8 || 88 || 124 || 212 || 44 || 49 || 0.5 || 0.6 || 6.3 || 8.9 || 15.1 || 3.1 || 3.5 || 0
|-
| 2011 ||  || 9
| 18 || 11 || 11 || 181 || 184 || 365 || 73 || 91 || 0.6 || 0.6 || 10.1 || 10.2 || 20.3 || 4.1 || 5.1 || 4
|-
| 2012 ||  || 9
| 24 || 19 || 6 || 301 || 222 || 523 || 113 || 101 || 0.8 || 0.3 || 12.5 || 9.3 || 21.8 || 4.7 || 4.2 || 11
|-
| 2013 ||  || 9
| 21 || 12 || 12 || 257 || 237 || 494 || 113 || 83 || 0.6 || 0.6 || 12.2 || 11.3 || 23.5 || 5.4 || 4.0 || 15
|-
| 2014 ||  || 9
| 22 || 13 || 9 || 269 || 252 || 521 || 105 || 147 || 0.6 || 0.4 || 12.2 || 11.5 || 23.7 || 4.8 || 6.7 || 10
|-
| 2015 ||  || 9
| 18 || 11 || 3 || 192 || 208 || 400 || 78 || 100 || 0.6 || 0.2 || 10.7 || 11.6 || 22.2 || 4.3 || 5.6 || 4
|-
| 2016 ||  || 9
| 23 || 13 || 10 || 271 || 309 || 580 || 88 || 163 || 0.6 || 0.4 || 11.8 || 13.4 || 25.2 || 3.8 || 7.1 || 24
|-
| 2017 ||  || 9
| 24 || 20 || 7 || 314 || 267 || 581 || 75 || bgcolor=CAE1FF | 186† || 0.8 || 0.3 || 13.1 || 11.1 || 24.2 || 3.1 || 7.8 || 20
|-
| 2018 ||  || 9
| 12 || 5 || 5 || 126 || 137 || 263 || 33 || 75 || 0.4 || 0.4 || 10.5 || 11.4 || 21.9 || 2.8 || 6.3 || 6
|-
| 2019 ||  || 9
| 22 || 11 || 9 || 266 || 275 || 541 || 97 || 129 || 0.5 || 0.4 || 12.1 || 12.5 || 24.6 || 4.4 || 5.9 || 7
|-
| 2020 ||  || 9
| 12 || 5 || 3 || 92 || 97 || 189 || 15 || 49 || 0.4 || 0.3 || 7.7 || 8.1 || 15.8 || 1.3 || 4.1 || 3
|-
| 2021 ||  || 9
| 18 || 3 || 2 || 198 || 204 || 402 || 67 || 87 || 0.2 || 0.1 || 11.0 || 11.3 || 22.3 || 3.7 || 4.8 || 2
|-
| 2022 ||  || 9
| 4 || 0 || 1 || 36 || 36 || 72 || 12 || 17 || 0.0 || 0.3 || 9.0 || 9.0 || 18.0 || 3.0 || 4.3 || 0
|-
| 2023 ||  || 9
| 1 || 0 || 0 || 12 || 6 || 18 || 7 || 2 || 0.0 || 0.0 || 12.0 || 6.0 || 18.0 || 7.0 || 2.0 || 0
|- class=sortbottom
! colspan=3 | Career
! 234 !! 130 !! 86 !! 2603 !! 2564 !! 5167 !! 921 !! 1287 !! 0.6 !! 0.4 !! 11.1 !! 11.0 !! 22.1 !! 3.9 !! 5.5 !! 106
|}

Notes

Honours and achievements
Team
 McClelland Trophy: 2017

Individual
 Adelaide captain: 2019–present
 All-Australian team: 2016
 2× Malcolm Blight Medal: 2013, 2016
 Robert Rose Award: 2017
 Australia representative honours in international rules football: 2017
 Victoria representative honours in State of Origin for Bushfire Relief Match
 Showdown Medal: 2017 (game 1)
 22under22 team: 2012

References

External links

 
 

Adelaide Football Club players
North Adelaide Football Club players
1990 births
Living people
Eastern Ranges players
Australian rules footballers from Melbourne
Malcolm Blight Medal winners
All-Australians (AFL)
Australian people of Irish descent
Australia international rules football team players